The Polish Red, is a Polish breed of dual-purpose cattle. It was established in the late 19th century when red cattle from Denmark, Germany and Sweden were cross-bred with various local strains of red Polish cattle.

Characteristics 

Use 

References

External links

Cattle breeds

Red cattle